Anhelina Kalinina and Elizaveta Kulichkova were the defending champions, but both players chose not to compete in 2015.

Miriam Kolodziejová and Markéta Vondroušová won the title, defeating Katharina Hobgarski and Greet Minnen in the final, 7–5, 6–4.

Seeds

Draw

Finals

Top half

Bottom half

External links 
 Draw  at ausopen.com
 Draw at itftennis.com

Girls' Doubles
Australian Open, 2015 Girls' Doubles